Zoo Diaries is a Canadian documentary television series airing on Life Network. The series documents the live of animals and people at a zoo with a record of breeding endangered species. 74 episodes have been produced since 2000 by DocuTainment Productions. The final episode aired in 2007.

Each episode opens with a brief description of the show's contents. Events in the life of three or four animals are shown, cutting between stories every couple of minutes. Each story focuses on an animal in an interesting situation, and the zoo person responsible for handling the situation. Some situations are resolved over a number of episodes, for example, developing and performing an animal show designed to startle the audience. Topics vary from birth to death.

The series is candid about the zoo employees' behavior and opinions.

It is filmed at the Toronto Zoo in Toronto, Ontario and narrated by Vince Corazza.

Episodes 1-37 are available on DVD. In Canada, the show currently airs on National Geographic Channel, Nat Geo Wild and Nickelodeon Canada.

External links

 IMDB entry
 Toronto Zoo website
 DocuTainment/MicroTainment Productions

2000s Canadian documentary television series
Zoos in Canada
Slice (TV channel) original programming
2000 Canadian television series debuts
2007 Canadian television series endings